Amya Briana Clarke (born 10 September 1999) is an athlete from Saint Kitts and Nevis.

From Christ Church where she attended Saddlers Secondary School before going to Iowa Western Community College, and the University of Akron in Ohio.
In June 2021, under the universality rule within the Olympic qualifying criteria which allows smaller nations with developing sports programs to send representatives to the competition she was confirmed as being selected for the delayed 2020 Summer Olympics in the 100 metres. She was awarded the honour of being the flag bearer for her nation in the opening ceremony. She won the 100 m silver medal in the 2021 NACAC U23 Championships. She won the 2021 Junior Pan American Games 100 m silver medal at the games held in Colombia.

References

External links
 

1999 births
Living people
Saint Kitts and Nevis female sprinters
Iowa Western Reivers women's track and field athletes
Akron Zips women's track and field athletes
People from Christ Church Nichola Town Parish
Athletes (track and field) at the 2020 Summer Olympics
Olympic female sprinters
Olympic athletes of Saint Kitts and Nevis
Athletes (track and field) at the 2022 Commonwealth Games